William Finlayson (29 March 1899 – 1979) was a Scottish professional footballer who played as a forward in the Football League for Brentford, Clapton Orient and Chelsea. He later played in the United States and Canada. His brother Bob was also a footballer.

Career statistics

References

1899 births
Scottish footballers
English Football League players
Brentford F.C. players
Association football forwards
Ashfield F.C. players]
Chelsea F.C. players
Leyton Orient F.C. players
Springfield Babes players
Providence Clamdiggers players
Bethlehem Steel F.C. (1907–1930) players
Scottish expatriate footballers
Scottish expatriate sportspeople in the United States
Scottish expatriate sportspeople in Canada
Expatriate soccer players in the United States
Expatriate soccer players in Canada
American Soccer League (1921–1933) players
1979 deaths
People from Thornliebank
Canadian National Soccer League players
Sportspeople from East Renfrewshire